Actinopus robustus is a species of mygalomorph spiders in the family Actinopodidae. It is found in Panama.

References

robustus
Spiders described in 1892